Monotropsis is a monotypic genus of plants containing the single species Monotropsis odorata, also known as sweet pinesap or pygmy pipes. It is a member of the subfamily Monotropoideae of the family Ericaceae. 
It is found in the states of Alabama, Delaware, Florida, Georgia, Kentucky, North Carolina, South Carolina, Tennessee and Virginia, and is native to the Appalachian Mountains in the south-eastern United States. It is viewed as being uncommon throughout its range.

Like all members of the subfamily, Monotropsis odorata does not contain chlorophyll; it is a myco-heterotroph, getting its food through parasitism upon fungi rather than photosynthesis. These fungi form a mycorrhiza with nearby tree species.

Monotropsis odorata has a sweet smell which has been likened to nutmeg, cinnamon or violets.

References

External links
 US Forest Service, Thieves from the Heath - Mycotrophic Wildflowers: Monotropsis odorata – Sweet Pinesap

Monotropoideae
Plants described in 1817
Flora of the Southeastern United States
Parasitic plants
Monotypic Ericaceae genera